Nógrád is a county of Hungary. It sits on the northern edge of Hungary and borders Slovakia.

Description
Nógrád county lies in northern Hungary. It shares borders with Slovakia and the Hungarian counties Pest, Heves and Borsod-Abaúj-Zemplén. The capital of Nógrád county is Salgótarján. Its area is 2,544 km². It is the smallest county by population and the second smallest by area (after Komárom-Esztergom).

Nógrád is famous for its historic architecture of ancient Gothic churches and stone castles dated to the 13th century. Some historic landmarks includes the Salgó Castle and several baroque buildings constructed in the 18th century and the Vay, Teleki. Much of the northern border of the county is formed by the river Ipoly. The mountain ranges Börzsöny, Cserhát and Mátra lie partly in the county.

Due to the mountains, the county is characterised by small villages nestled in the valleys. The two largest settlements are Balassagyarmat, the former county seat, and Salgótarján, which has become a center of industry in the early 20th century due to coal mines nearby.

History

Nógrád (-Hungarian, in Latin: comitatus Neogradiensis, in German: Neuburg or Neograd, in Slovak: Novohrad) was also the name of a historic administrative county (comitatus) of the Kingdom of Hungary. The name stems from the former Nógrád castle ( - this name is still used in Slovakia as well as the informal designation of the corresponding territory, now located in southern Slovakia and in northern Hungary).

Demographics

In 2015, it had a population of 195,923 and the population density was 77/km².

Ethnicity
Besides the Hungarian majority, the main minorities are the Roma (approx. 15,000), Slovak (2,500) and German (1,000).

Total population (2011 census): 202,427
Ethnic groups (2011 census):
Identified themselves: 192,438 persons:
Hungarians: 172,946 (89.87%)
Gypsies: 15.177 (7.89%)
Slovaks: 2,644 (1.37%)
Others and indefinable: 1,671 (0.87%)
Approx. 26,000 persons in Nógrád County did not declare their ethnic group at the 2011 census.

Religion

Religious adherence in the county according to 2011 census:

Catholic – 112,640 (Roman Catholic – 112,241; Greek Catholic – 389);
Evangelical – 7,858;
Reformed – 4,167; 
Other religions – 3,672; 
Non-religious – 24,717; 
Atheism – 1,740;
Undeclared – 47,633.

Regional structure

Politics 

The Nógrád County Council, elected at the 2019 local government elections, is made up of 15 counselors, with the following party composition:

Presidents of the General Assembly

Municipalities 
Nógrád County has 1 urban county, 5 towns and 125 villages.

City with county rights
(ordered by population, as of 2011 census)
  Salgótarján (37,262) – county seat

Towns

  Balassagyarmat (16,397)
  Bátonyterenye (12,841)
  Pásztó (9,689)
  Szécsény (5,962)
  Rétság (2,822)

Villages

Alsópetény
Alsótold
Bánk
Bárna
Becske
Bercel
Berkenye
Bér
Bokor
Borsosberény
Buják
Cered
Csécse
Cserháthaláp
Cserhátsurány
Cserhátszentiván
Csesztve
Csitár
Debercsény
Dejtár
Diósjenő
Dorogháza
Drégelypalánk
Ecseg
Egyházasdengeleg
Egyházasgerge
Endrefalva
Erdőkürt
Erdőtarcsa
Érsekvadkert
Etes
Felsőpetény
Felsőtold
Galgaguta
Garáb
Herencsény
Héhalom
Hollókő
Hont
Horpács
Hugyag
Iliny
Ipolyszög
Ipolytarnóc
Ipolyvece
Jobbágyi
Karancsalja
Karancsberény
Karancskeszi
Karancslapujtő
Karancsság
Kazár
Kálló
Keszeg
Kétbodony
Kisbágyon
Kisbárkány
Kisecset
Kishartyán
Kozárd
Kutasó
Legénd
Litke
Lucfalva
Ludányhalászi
Magyargéc
Magyarnándor
Márkháza
Mátramindszent
Mátranovák
Mátraszele
Mátraszőlős
Mátraterenye
Mátraverebély
Mihálygerge
Mohora
Nagybárkány
Nagykeresztúr
Nagylóc
Nagyoroszi
Nemti
Nézsa
Nógrád
Nógrádkövesd
Nógrádmarcal
Nógrádmegyer
Nógrádsáp
Nógrádsipek
Nógrádszakál
Nőtincs
Őrhalom
Ősagárd
Palotás
Patak
Patvarc
Piliny
Pusztaberki
Rákóczibánya
Rimóc
Romhány
Ságújfalu
Sámsonháza
Somoskőújfalu
Sóshartyán
Szalmatercs
Szanda
Szarvasgede
Szátok
Szendehely
Szente
Szécsénke
Szécsényfelfalu
Szilaspogony
Szirák
Szuha
Szurdokpüspöki
Szügy
Tar
Terény
Tereske
Tolmács
Vanyarc
Varsány
Vizslás
Zabar

Gallery

References

External links
 Official site in Hungarian
 Nógrád Megyei Hírlap (nhc24.hu) - The county portal
Photos from Nograd County

 
Counties of Hungary